Solomon Islands competed at the 2019 Pacific Games in Apia, Samoa from 7 to 20 July 2019. The country participated in 22 sports at the 2019 games. With Honiara as the host of the 2023 Pacific Games, the Solomon segment is expected to be performed at the closing ceremony.

Archery

Athletics

Basketball

5x5

Men's basketball
 TBC

Women's basketball
 TBC

3x3

Men
 TBC

Women
 TBC

Boxing

Football

Men's football

Squad
TBC

Women's football

Squad
TBC

Golf

Solomon Islands nominated nine men and seven women for the tournament in Samoa, with five and three respectively to be omitted. The men's and women's teams will each have four players participating in the 2019 games. 

Men
 Alick Dalo
 George Rubako
 Wesley Sifaka
 Sai Dalo
 Harrison Stewart
 Paul Foeadi
 Ben Felani
 Thomas Felani
 Tonny Ramo

Women
 Ravatu Tabe
 Norma Wopereis
 Doreen Sam
 Everlyn Maelasi
 Ronica Tyson
 Siru Hickie
 Marcella Qilabari

Judo

Netball

Outrigger canoeing

Powerlifting

Rugby league nines

Men's rugby league
 TBC

Women's rugby league
 TBC

Rugby sevens

Men's sevens

Women's sevens

Sailing

Swimming

Table tennis

Taekwondo

Tennis

Touch rugby

Triathlon

Volleyball

Beach volleyball

Volleyball (Indoor)

Weightlifting

References

Nations at the 2019 Pacific Games
2019